"Remixes 2004" is a single by Greek pop singer Anna Vissi, which was released in the summer of 2004 and included in the repackaged edition of her album Paraksenes Eikones, which was also released at the same time. This single featured the song "Eisai" which is the original version of the international hit "Call Me" which topped the Billboard Dance Charts in 2005. It reached Gold status.

Track listing
In addition to the following songs, the disc includes the music video of "Min Psahneis Tin Agapi".
"Ego Moro Mou (Elias Pantazopoulos Remix)"
"Eho Pethani Gia Sena (Valentino Remix)"
"Eisai (The Prodical Son Remix)"
"Eisai (Elias Pantazopoulos Remix)"
"Fevgo (Sonic Crime Remix)"

Chart performance

External links
Anna Vissi Official Website

2004 EPs
Albums produced by Nikos Karvelas
Greek-language albums
2004 remix albums
Remix EPs
Anna Vissi EPs
Anna Vissi remix albums
Sony Music Greece remix albums
Sony Music Greece EPs
Columbia Records remix albums
Columbia Records EPs